The 2010–11 season was Brighton & Hove Albion's 
fourth consecutive season in the League One. It was their last season at the Withdean Stadium before moving to Falmer Stadium. Brighton won League One in this season, gaining promotion to the Football League Championship for the 2011–12 season.

Key dates
2010
7.5.10: Swansea defender Marcos Painter agrees to a two-year pre-contract which he later signs.
11.6.10: Albion sign goalkeeper Michael Poke from fellow League One side Southampton.
28.6.10: Argentinean Club Comunicaciones players Agustín Battipiedi and Cristian Baz both sign one-year contracts.
29.6.10: After spending over a decade at Scunthorpe United Midfielder Matt Sparrow signs a three-year contract.
8.7.10: Albion acquires young gun Ashley Barnes from Plymouth Argyle with the striker signing a two-year contract.
11.7.10: Speculation is ended when it is announced Gordon Greer is transferring from Swindon Town to take up a three-year contract with the seagulls.
16.7.10: Brighton sign former Bulgarian international Radostin Kishishev on a one-year deal.
2011
28.1.11: Chairman Tony Bloom confirms that Elliott Bennett has submitted a transfer request. He told seagulls.co.uk "Nothing has changed. We do not want to sell Elliott, we don't need to sell the player."
12.1.11: Promotion to Championship secured with 4–3 win over Dagenham & Redbridge.

League table

First team
As of 29 January 2011.

Matches

Pre-season friendlies

League One

Notes

FA Cup
As they will be playing in League One, Albion will enter the 2010–11 FA Cup at the First Round Proper.

Football League Cup

League Trophy

Statistics

Appearances, goals and cards
As of Fixture vs Notts County(7 May 2011).
(Substitute appearances in brackets)

Formation

Monthly awards

Team of the Year
League One

Transfers

In

Out

Loan in

Loan out

Trialists

References

Brighton & Hove Albion F.C. seasons
Brighton and Hove Albion